Khunu Lama Tenzin Gyaltsen , 1894–1977, known also as Negi Lama Tenzin Gyaltsen,  Tenzin Gyaltsen (bstan 'dzin rgyal mtshan), and various other names like Kunu (khu nu) Rinpoche, Kunu Lama and Negi Lama (ne gi bla ma), was born in 1894 in the village of Sunam which lies in the forest-clad Kinnaur district of India in the western Himalayas. Khunu Rinpoche was neither a tulku nor a Buddhist monk but a layman (Skt. upāsaka) who took the lay practitioner's vows .

He is renowned as one of the influential teachers in the Rimé (non-sectarian) movement within Tibetan Buddhism. A foremost scholar of Sanskrit and Classical Tibetan, Khunu Rinpoche traveled widely in Tibet and India disseminating essential teachings of Buddhist philosophy.

His students include Drikung Khandro, Khenpo Konchok Gyaltsen, Lamkhen Gyalpo Rinpoche and the 14th Dalai Lama of Tibet. Although the Dalai Lama had other highly qualified teachers and debate partners for religious matters, he used to clarify philosophical concepts in discussions with Khunu Lama.  Among several teachings that the Dalai Lama received from Khunu Rinpoche was the celebrated Bodhisattvacaryāvatāra or Guide to the Bodhisattva's Way of Life by Shantideva. The Dalai Lama called him the "Shantideva of our time." and often mentions him when teaching.

His seminal work on bodhicitta was translated and published under the title of Vast as the Heavens, Deep as the Sea: Verses in Praise of Bodhicitta by Wisdom Publications in 1999.

He died at Shashur Monastery in Lahaul and Spiti district of Himachal Pradesh at the age of 82 on February 20, 1977.

Two reincarnations of Khunu Lama have been identified, both of whom are teachers in the Buddhist tradition. Jangchhub Nyima was born to a Tibetan father and Danish mother and currently teaches in India and Denmark. Tenzin Priyadarshi was born into a family of Brahmin parents in Bihar, India and is known for his continued interest in Sanskrit Buddhist literature and was the first Buddhist Chaplain at the Massachusetts Institute of Technology.

References

Sources

External links
Negi Lama Tenzin Gyaltsen – A preliminary account of the life of a modern Buddhist saint by Thierry Dodin
Khunu Lama Tenzin Gyaltsen at Rigpa Wiki
Sunlight Blessings that Cure the Longing of Remembrance: A Biography of the Omniscient Khunu Mahāsattva, Tenzin Gyeltsen (Khunu Lama Rinpoche), by Lamchen Gyalpo Rinpoche, translated from Tibetan by Erick Tsiknopoulos and Mike Dickman
The One-Page Prayer: A Prayer to Khunu Lama Rinpoche Composed by Khunu Lama Rinpoche Himself, Translated from Tibetan by Erick Tsiknopoulos

Tibetan Buddhist spiritual teachers
Rimé lamas
Tibetan Buddhists from India
1895 births
1977 deaths
Indian Buddhists
People from Kinnaur district